Kulambadikal is a 1986 Indian Malayalam film, directed by Crossbelt Mani. The film stars Jagathy Sreekumar, Ashwathy, Ratheesh and Menaka in the lead roles. The film has musical score by Guna Singh.

Cast

Jagathy Sreekumar
Ashwathy
Ratheesh
Menaka
Anuradha
Bahadoor
Balan K. Nair
G. K. Pillai
Kaduvakulam Antony
Kuthiravattam Pappu
Nellikode Bhaskaran
Ramu
Valsala Menon

Soundtrack
The music was composed by Guna Singh and the lyrics were written by Bharanikkavu Sivakumar.

References

External links
 

1986 films
1980s Malayalam-language films